The Delsarte–Goethals code is a type of error-correcting code.

History 

The concept was introduced by mathematicians Ph. Delsarte and J.-M. Goethals in their published paper.

A new proof of the properties of the Delsarte–Goethals code was published in 1970.

Function 

The Delsarte–Goethals code DG(m,r) for even m ≥ 4 and 0 ≤ r ≤ m/2 − 1 is a binary, non-linear code of length , size  and minimum distance 

The code sits between the Kerdock code and the second-order Reed–Muller codes. More precisely, we have

 

When r = 0, we have DG(m,r) = K(m) and when r = m/2 − 1 we have DG(m,r) = RM(2,m).

For r = m/2 − 1 the Delsarte–Goethals code has strength 7 and is therefore an orthogonal array OA(.

References 

Coding theory
Error detection and correction